Lemurodendron is a genus of flowering plants in the  family Fabaceae. It belongs to the mimosoid clade in the subfamily Caesalpinioideae. It contains one species, Lemurodendron capuronii.

References

Mimosoids
Fabaceae genera